The John Young House is located in Muscoda, Wisconsin.

History
John Young was a German immigrant who served in the American Civil War and worked as a lumber dealer. The house was for some time a bed and breakfast but since the owner has died it is now a private residence. It was added to the State and the National Register of Historic Places in 1994.

References

Houses on the National Register of Historic Places in Wisconsin
Commercial buildings on the National Register of Historic Places in Wisconsin
National Register of Historic Places in Grant County, Wisconsin
Houses in Grant County, Wisconsin
Queen Anne architecture in Wisconsin